Rainey is a name of British-Irish origin.

People with the surname 
 Anson Rainey (born 1930), Israeli professor of Ancient Near Eastern cultures 
 Bobby Rainey (born 1987), American National Football League player
 Chuck Rainey (born 1940), American bassist
 David "Puck" Rainey (born 1968), American reality TV personality
 Darren Rainey (1962–2012), American prison inmate who died of burns from a scalding shower
 Edward Rainey (born 1961), Scottish painter
 Ford Rainey (1908–2005), American actor
 Grace Rainey Rogers (1867–1943), American art collector, philanthropist
 Henry Thomas Rainey (1860–1934), American politician
 John W. Rainey (1880–1923), U.S. Representative from Illinois
 John Rainey (baseball) (1864–1912), American Major League Baseball player
 John David Rainey (born 1945), U.S. federal judge
 Jon Douglas Rainey (born 1970), American professional thief on the reality TV show It Takes a Thief
 Joseph Rainey (1832–1887), American politician, first African-American United States Representative and second biracial Congressman
 Lawrence A. Rainey (1923–2002), American sheriff
 Ma Rainey (1882–1939), American blues singer
 Matt Rainey, winner of the 2001 Pulitzer Prize for Feature Photography
 Paul J. Rainey (1877–1923), American businessman, philanthropist, hunter and photographer
 Philip Rainey (born 1959), Irish former rugby union player
 Robert E. L. Rainey (1914–2002), American artist
 Tanner Rainey (born 1992), American Major League Baseball pitcher
 Wayne Rainey (born 1960), American motorcycle racer
 William Rainey Harper (1856–1906), American academic administrator

People with the given name 
 Rainey Bennett (1907–1998), American artist and illustrator
 Rainey Bethea (c. 1909–1936), last person to be publicly executed in the United States
 Rainey Gaffin, 2015 and 2016 National Fastpitch Coaches Association All-American - see Tennessee Volunteers softball
 Rainey Haynes (born 1964), American singer-songwriter also known simply as "Rainey"

See also 
 Meredith Rainey-Valmon (born 1968), American runner
 East African cheetah, also known as Rainey's cheetah in honor of Paul J. Rainey
 Raney, a surname
 Ranney (disambiguation)